Reparje is a small settlement in the upper part of the Cerkniščica Valley east of Begunje in the Municipality of Cerknica in the Inner Carniola region of Slovenia.

References

External links

Reparje on Geopedia

Populated places in the Municipality of Cerknica